Joseph-Théophile Larochelle (November 19, 1877 – October 8, 1954) was a politician of Quebec, Canada and a Member of the Legislative Assembly of Quebec (MLA).

Early life

He was born on November 19, 1877 near Lévis, Chaudière-Appalaches and worked in Massachusetts for four years.

Local politics

Larochelle served as a city councillor and as a school board member in Lévis.

Member of the legislature

He ran as an Action libérale nationale candidate in the district of Lévis in the 1935 provincial election and won. Larochelle joined Maurice Duplessis's Union Nationale and was re-elected in the 1936 election. He was defeated by Liberal candidate Joseph-Georges Francoeur in the 1939 election.

Political comeback

Larochelle was re-elected in the 1944 and 1948 elections. He became Minister without Portfolio in 1944.

Legislative Councillor

He resigned in 1948 to accept a seat in the Legislative Council of Quebec and represented the division of La Salle until his death.

Death

He died on October 8, 1954 in Lévis.

Footnotes

1877 births
1954 deaths
Action libérale nationale MNAs
Union Nationale (Quebec) MLCs
Union Nationale (Quebec) MNAs